David Sánchez Muñoz (born 20 April 1978) is a retired Spanish tennis player. He turned professional in 1997. In 2003 he won both the Open Romania and the Movistar Open. He reached his career high singles ranking of World No. 41 on 24 February 2003.

During his third round run at the 2001 French Open, Sánchez defeated the previous year's finalist Magnus Norman and former champion Carlos Moya in five sets, and took a set off Roger Federer.

ATP career finals

Singles: 2 (2 titles)

ATP Challenger and ITF Futures finals

Singles: 12 (5–7)

Performance timeline

Singles

Wins over top 10 ranked players

Wins over Top 10s per season

External links
 
 

Spanish male tennis players
1978 births
Living people